A signal is any variation of a medium that conveys information. 

Signal or signaling may refer to:

Science and technology
 Analog signal
 Audio signal
 Digital signal
 Digital signal (signal processing)
 Cell signaling, in biology
 Signalling (economics), in economics theory
 Signalling theory, in evolutionary biology
 Time signal

Computing
 SIGNAL (programming language), a synchronous programming language
 Signal (software), an end-to-end encrypted voice calling, video calling and instant messaging application
 Signal Protocol, a cryptographic protocol used by the Signal application
 Signal (IPC), a form of inter-process communication used in Unix and related operating systems
 C signal handling, a way for handling signals received by programs during their execution
 A term in functional reactive programming

Communications
 International Code of Signals, a standard for sending signals by displaying flags
 Maritime flag signalling, generally flaghoist signalling, by which ships communicate with each other
 Naval flag signalling, covers various forms of flag signalling, such as semaphore or flaghoist
 Military communications, often called "signals"
 Recognition signal in human, technical or biological communications
 Signaling protocol to establish or tear down a connection, and to identify the state of the connection
 Signaling (telecommunications), a part of some communication protocols
 Smoke signal, an ancient form of communication
 Telegraphic signal, in telegraphy

Transportation
 Railway signal
 Traffic light

Arts and entertainment
 Signal (magazine), a Wehrmacht propaganda magazine which was published in occupied Europe during World War II
 SIGNAL (US magazine), publication of the Armed Forces Communications and Electronics Association
 Signal, a New York Yiddish-language literary monthly published from 1933 to 1936 by the Communist Party USA
 Signal (novel), a 2009 children's novel about a boy who helps a girl from another planet signal her parents
 Signal (South Korean TV series), a 2016 South Korean police procedural TV series
 Signal (Japanese TV series), a 2018 Japanese police procedural TV series based on the 2016 South Korean series of the same name
 Signal – The Southeast Electronic Music Festival, an annual music festival held in the US
 Signal, Wyoming, a fictional town from the 2005 film Brokeback Mountain
 "Signals", a 2005 episode of the animated television series 12 oz. Mouse

Music
 Signal (band), a Bulgarian rock band

Albums
 Signal (album), a 2005 album by Casiopea
 Signals (Mal Waldron album), 1971
 Signals (Mallory Knox album), the début album of the Mallory Knox band
 Signals (Rush album), 1982
 Signals (Wayne Krantz album), 1990
 Signals, an album by American band Devour the Day
  Signal (EP), a 2017 extended play by South Korean girl group Twice

Songs
 "Signal" (KAT-TUN song), a 2006 Japanese song by KAT-TUN
 "Signal" (Twice song), a song recorded by South Korean girl group Twice
 "Signal", a song by General Degree
 "Signal", a single by Stan Getz
 "Signal", a song from the 2006 Bollywood film Bhagam Bhag
 "Signal", a song by Sara Groves from the album Floodplain

Places

United States
 Signal, Arizona, a ghost town
 Signal, Missouri, a ghost town
 Signal, Ohio, an unincorporated community

Organizations
 Signal Systems, a telecommunications company of the McLean Group of Companies
 Signal Foundation, a non-profit organization

Other uses
 Signal (bridge), a permitted means of conveying information to partner through the play of cards in contract bridge
 Citation signal, in law
 Signal (toothpaste)
 USS Signal, several US Navy ships

See also
 Digital signal (disambiguation)
 Signaal, former name of the Dutch defense company Thales Nederland
 Signal 1, a radio station
 Signal 2, a radio station
 The Signal (disambiguation)
 Signal Mountain (disambiguation) 
 Virtue signalling, the conspicuous expression of moral values